Ehsan Latif (born 8 May 1985) is a German cricketer. He was named in Germany's squad for the 2017 ICC World Cricket League Division Five tournament in South Africa. He played in Germany's second fixture, against Jersey, on 4 September 2017.

References

External links
 

1985 births
Living people
German cricketers
Place of birth missing (living people)